is a Japanese trap shooter. She won a gold medal in the women's trap at the 2001 ISSF World Cup final in Doha, Qatar, achieved a fifth-place finish at the 2002 Asian Games in Busan, South Korea, and represented her nation Japan in two editions of the Olympic Games (2000 and 2004). During her sporting career, Takeba trained full-time for the Ehime Clay Shooting Association under her personal coach Atsushi Otsuke

Takeba made her official debut at the 2000 Summer Olympics in Sydney, where she wound up to sixteenth in the inaugural women's trap with a score of 56 hits, narrowly escaping from the last spot in a field of seventeen shooters by four points.

Shortly after the Games, Takeba rose to a sporting fame with a gold medal victory over Russian shooter and world record holder Elena Tkach at the 2001 ISSF World Cup final with a remarkable score of 88 targets.

At the 2004 Summer Olympics in Athens, Takeba qualified for her second Japanese squad, as a 38-year-old, in the women's trap by attaining a minimum score of 68 and securing an Olympic ticket from the 2002 ISSF World Cup series in Shanghai, China. Improving her position from the previous Games, she amassed a total score of 59 hits out of 75 targets in the qualifying stage, but narrowly missed the final round by a single-point deficit with an eighth-place finish.

References

External links
Japanese Olympic Committee Bio 
ISSF Profile

1966 births
Living people
Japanese female sport shooters
Olympic shooters of Japan
Shooters at the 2000 Summer Olympics
Shooters at the 2004 Summer Olympics
Asian Games medalists in shooting
Shooters at the 1994 Asian Games
Shooters at the 1998 Asian Games
Shooters at the 2002 Asian Games
Sportspeople from Kobe
Asian Games bronze medalists for Japan
Medalists at the 2002 Asian Games
20th-century Japanese women
21st-century Japanese women